Gentry High School may refer to:

 Gentry High School (Arkansas) - Gentry, Arkansas
 Gentry High School (Mississippi) - Indianola, Mississippi